Georgenberg (German for "George['s] Mountain") is the name of several mountains and may also refer to:

Places
 Georgenberg, Neustadt,  municipality in Bavaria, Germany
 Georgenberg (Reutlingen), mountain in Baden-Württemberg, Germany
 Miasteczko Śląskie, town in Upper Silesia, Poland (German: Georgenberg O.S., Georgenberg (Oberschlesien))

Abbeys
St. Georgenberg-Fiecht Abbey

See also
 Georgenburg (disambiguation) (German for "George['s] Castle")